The Arakkal Museum is a museum dedicated to the Arakkal family, the only Muslim royal family in Kerala, India. The museum is actually a section of the Arakkalkettu (Arakkal Royal Palace). The durbar hall section of the palace has been converted into a museum by the Government of Kerala. It was opened in July 2005 after a Rs. 9,000,000 renovation.

Although renovated by the government, the Arakkalkettu is still owned by the Arakkal Royal Trust and does not fall under the control of the country's archaeology department, the Archaeological Survey of India. The government had taken a keen interest in preserving the heritage of the Arakkal Family, which had played a prominent role in the history of Malabar. A nominal entry fee is charged by the Arakkal Royal Trust from visitors to the museum.

Location 
The Arakkal Museum is located in Ayikkara, next to the Kannur City. It is located 2-3 kilometres from Kannur town.

Departments 
 Operations
 Research and Development
 Communications and Public Informations
 Protocol and Liaison Service
 Registration and Permissions

Photo gallery

External links 
 Arakkal Kettu dedicated to the nation, The Hindu, 31 July 2005.
 Royal Absurdity

References

Museums established in 2005
Education in Kannur
Museums in Kerala
Biographical museums in India
2005 establishments in Kerala
Buildings and structures in Kannur
Royal residences in India